Mariya Stadnik (Mariya Vasylivna Stadnyk; born 3 June 1988) is a Ukrainian-born Azerbaijani  female wrestler. She is a four-time Olympic medalist.

Personal life
Stadnik was born on 3 June 1988 in Lviv, Ukrainian SSR, Soviet Union. She started wrestling in 2000, graduated from Lviv State University of Physical Culture. She is married to Ukrainian wrestler Andriy Stadnik. The couple have a son, Igor, born in 2010, and a daughter, Mia, born in 2013. Her sister-in-law, Yana Rattigan, competes in the same weight category as Mariya. Mariya Stadnik and Yana Stadnik have met three times in international competitions, with Mariya Stadnik winning all three times.

Career
Maria Stadnik competed at the European Junior Championship, which took place in August 2003 in Seville, Spain. In the final match of the tournament, Maria Stadnik won the victory over the representative of Romania Alina Pogachan and became the winner of the European Junior Championship. This gold medal was the first that 14-year-old Maria Stadnik won at international tournaments. A year later, in July 2004, Maria Stadnik once again competed at the European Junior Championships. In the final match of the tournament, which took place in Albena, Bulgaria, Maria Stadnik lost to Swedish representative Sofia Mattsson and won the silver medal of the tournament. The next tournament in which Maria Stadnik competed was the Junior World Championship, which took place in July 2005 in Vilnius, Lithuania. Maria Stadnik faced the representative of India Sudes Kumar in the 1/8 finals of the tournament. In that match, Maria Stadnik won ahead of Schedule (2:44 minutes) over her rival and reached the 1/4 final stage. His opponent at this stage was the representative of Germany Anniha Hofmann. In this match, Maria Stadnik won ahead of time (1:44 minutes) over her rival and reached the semi-final stage of the tournament. At this stage, his opponent was the representative of Turkey Demet Kaya. Also in the third match, Maria Stadnik won ahead of schedule over her rival and qualified for the final match of the championship. And in the decisive match, his opponent was the representative of Vietnam Ti Han Nguyen.  In the Final match, Maria Stadnik also won ahead of schedule. Having defeated his opponent in 2:50 minutes with a score of 8:0, 16-year-old Maria Stadnik became the winner of the World Junior Championship.

Maria Stadnik, who won the European Junior Championship and the World Junior Championship in three years, In 2006, he competed at the European Championship, which took place in Russia on April 25-30. Maria Stadnik faced Greek representative Fani Psata in the 1/8 finals of the tournament. In that match, Mariya Stadnik won over the opponent (2:0) and reached the 1/4 finals. Her opponent at this stage was the representative of Finland Hagar Ashtiani. Mariya Stadnik defeated her rival (2:0) and reached the semi-final stage of the tournament. On the way to the final, her rival was the representative of Romania Christina Kroitor.] Maria Stadnik's rival in the third match she won over him (2:0) and qualified for the final match of the championship. In the decisive match, his opponent was the representative of Russia Lilia Kasharova. In the third part of the match, which took place in a tense Sports struggle, Maria Stadnik won a victory over her rival and won the Gold Medal of the European Championship. However, in June of 2006, International Wrestling Federation (FILA) reported that Furosemide, a prohibited drug, was found in the blood test taken from Maria Stadnik, and she was deprived of her gold medal at the European Championship. He was also sentenced to one year not to compete in international tournaments.

In April 2007, Maria Stadnik's sentence for not competing in international tournaments for a year ended. The main tournament of the year was the World Championship, which will take place in September. That tournament licensed the 2008 Olympics. But there was intense competition to become the "number one" of the national team. The winner of the 2004 Olympics, Iryna Merleni, completed her maternity leave and regained her athletic form. Its main goal was the 2008 Olympics. The coaches of the team said that 18-year-old Maria Stadnik was young and inexperienced, and Iryna Merleni would go to the World Championship in September. Young Maria Stadnik, whose main goal was to compete at the 2008 Olympics, left the Ukrainian national team. In 2007, the World Championship would take place in Azerbaijan. On the eve, the Azerbaijan Wrestling Federation (AWF) began recruiting wrestlers from other national teams to form the Azerbaijani women's national team. Maria Kachina from Russia, Olesya Zamula from Latvia, and Yulia Ratkevich from Belarus were recruited to the Azerbaijani national team. The Azerbaijan Wrestling Federation (AWF) also invited Maria Stadnik to compete in the Azerbaijani national team. Maria Stadnik accepted the invitation and thus began to compete in international tournaments for the Azerbaijani national team. 

The main tournament of 2007 was the World Championship, which took place on September 16-24. Maria Stadnik competed in the tournament held at the Heydar Aliyev Sports Arena on September 21.[17] in the 1/32 finals of the tournament, her rival was the representative of Romania Christina Croitoru. In that match, Maria Stadnik won a premature victory over her rival (6:0, 4:0) and reached the 1/16 final stage. His opponent at this stage was the representative of South Korea Kim Hyun-Jo. In this match, Maria Stadnik won a premature victory over her rival (2:0, 8: 0) and reached the 1/8 finals. His rival at this stage was the representative of Germany Brigitte Wagner, who won the world and European Championships. In the match, which took place in a tense sports struggle, Maria Stadnik told her opponent 2:0 (1:0, 4:2) she won with his score and advanced to the 1/4 finals of the championship. At this stage, his rival was Chiharu Icho, a representative of Japan, who was a finalist of the 2004 Athens Olympics, this meeting took place in an atmosphere of intense sports struggle. As a result, Maria Stadnik 1:2 (1:0, 1:1, 1:1) she lost with her score and continued the fight in the repechage group. Maria Stadnik faced US Representative Stephanie Murata in the first meeting of this group. Maria Stadnik lost to her rival in that match (1:2, 1:1). Mariya Stadnik finished 7th, but later the CAS decided that all results obtained by her between 26 April 2006 and 25 April 2008 must be disqualified.

Competing in the freestyle – 48 kg weight class, she won gold at the 2008 European Championships in Tampere and bronze at the 2008 Summer Olympics in Beijing.

Stadnik went on to win gold at the 2009 European Championships in Vilnius, the 2009 World Championships in Herning, the 2019 World Championships in Nur-Sultan, and the 2011 European Championships in Dortmund. At the 2012 Summer Olympics in London, she was awarded the silver medal.

She won silver at the 2016 Summer Olympics in Rio de Janeiro, Brazil.

In 2018, she won the silver medal in the women's 50 kg event at the Klippan Lady Open in Klippan, Sweden. In 2021, she won the gold medal in her event at the 2021 Poland Open held in Warsaw, Poland.

In 2022, she won the gold medal in the 50 kg event at the 2021 Islamic Solidarity Games held in Konya, Turkey.

At the Summer Olympics

References

External links
 

1988 births
Living people
Ukrainian female sport wrestlers
Azerbaijani female sport wrestlers
Ukrainian emigrants to Azerbaijan
Ukrainian sportspeople in doping cases
Doping cases in wrestling
Olympic silver medalists for Azerbaijan
Olympic bronze medalists for Azerbaijan
Olympic wrestlers of Azerbaijan
Wrestlers at the 2008 Summer Olympics
Wrestlers at the 2012 Summer Olympics
Wrestlers at the 2016 Summer Olympics
Wrestlers at the 2020 Summer Olympics
Sportspeople from Lviv
Olympic medalists in wrestling
Medalists at the 2008 Summer Olympics
Medalists at the 2012 Summer Olympics
Medalists at the 2016 Summer Olympics
Medalists at the 2020 Summer Olympics
European Games gold medalists for Azerbaijan
European Games medalists in wrestling
Wrestlers at the 2015 European Games
Naturalized citizens of Azerbaijan
World Wrestling Championships medalists
Wrestlers at the 2019 European Games
European Wrestling Championships medalists
Islamic Solidarity Games medalists in wrestling
Islamic Solidarity Games competitors for Azerbaijan
European Wrestling Champions